František Domažlický (13 May 1913 in Prague – 29 October 1997 in Prague) was a Czech composer.

He was born František Tausig. He was sent to Theresienstadt but survived.

Selected works
Orchestral
 Serenade in D for string orchestra, Op. 16 (1954)
 Habanera (1955)
 Suite, Op. 26 (1959–1960)
 Divertimento, Op. 29 (1962)
 Symphony (1962)
 Prskavky (Squibs), Suite for string orchestra, Op. 30 (1963)
 Ouvertura piccola, Op. 42 (1970)
 Suita danza for string orchestra, Op. 52 (1982); also for 4 saxophones and brass quintet, or 2 accordions (or 2 violins) and piano
 Malá taneční suita (Little Dance Suite) for small chamber orchestra, Op. 57 (1965)
 Serenata da camera for string orchestra, Op. 64 (1987)
 Encore, Op. 74 (1991)
 Petriana Overture, arrangement for string orchestra (1993)

Concertante
 Concerto for oboe and string orchestra, Op. 25 (1958)
 Concerto No. 1 for violin and orchestra, Op. 28 (1961)
 Concerto for trombone and orchestra, Op. 35 (1964)
 Concerto for viola and orchestra, Op. 36 (1965–1966)
 Jaro rytíře d'Artagnana (The Spring of the Knight d'Artagnan), Symphonic Picture for cello and orchestra, Op. 40 (1968)
 Concerto for horn and orchestra, Op. 43 (1971)
 Concerto for bassoon and orchestra, Op. 44 (1972)
 Concerto No. 2 for violin and orchestra, Op. 47 (1975)
 Concerto for flute and string orchestra, Op. 48 (1976–1977)
 Concerto for clarinet and string orchestra, Op. 50 (1980–1981)
 Concerto for 2 violins and string orchestra, Op. 51 (1981–1982)
 Concerto rustico for double bass and string orchestra, Op. 55 (1983)
 Concerto for tuba and string orchestra, Op. 53 (1983)
 Concerto for trumpet and orchestra, Op. 60 (1986)
 Concerto for alto saxophone and orchestra, Op. 65 (1988)
 Concertino for bagpipes and orchestra, Op. 76 (1991)

Chamber music
 Píseň beze slov (Song without Words) for string quartet (1942)
 Duet for 2 violins, Op. 2 (1953)
 Duet for 2 clarinets, Op. 3 (1953)
 Romance for clarinet and piano, Op. 8 (1953)
 Šest národních písní (6 Folk Songs) for 2 violins and viola, Op. 13 (1954)
 Wind Quintet No. 1, Op. 23 (1956)
 Tři skladby (3 Pieces) for violin and piano, Op. 24 (1957)
 String Quartet No. 2, Op. 32 (1962–1963)
 Polní kvítí (Wild Flowers), Suite for oboe and harp, Op. 31 (1962)
 Piano Trio, Op. 34 (1963–1964)
 Komorní hudba (Chamber Music) for violin, cello, bass clarinet and guitar, Op. 38 (1966)
 Wind Quintet No. 2, Op. 39 (1967)
 Pět bagatel (5 Bagatelles) for viola and piano, Op. 41 (1969)
 Con moto for violin and piano (1969)
 Sen mládí (Youth Dream) for 3 recorders, 2 violins, cello and piano (1971)
 Koncert pro dechový oktet (Concerto for Wind Octet: 2 oboes, 2 clarinets, 2 horns and 2 bassoons), Op. 45 (1973)
 Sonata for trumpet and piano, Op. 49 (1979)
 Suita danza, version for 2 violins and piano, Op. 52 (1982)
 Duet for 2 tubas, Op. 53a (1983)
 Hudba pro čtyři saxofony (Music for Four Saxophones), Op. 54 (1983)
 Žesťový kvintet (Brass Quintet) for 2 trumpets, horn, trombone and tuba, Op. 56 (1984)
 String Quartet No. 3, Op. 57 (1984)
 Sonata for trombone and piano Op. 58 (1985)
 Trio-Sonata for violin, marimba and guitar, Op. 59 (1985)
 Partita for organ and 5 brass instruments, Op. 66 (1988)
 Flight of a Gull for English horn and piano, Op. 72 (1990)
 Wind Quintet No. 3, Op. 73 (1990)
 Ragtime I, II for wind quintet, Op. 73a (1990)
 Sonatina for tuba and piano, Op. 75 (1991)
 Scherzo for tuba and piano, Op. 77 (1992)
 Hudba pro housle a violu (Music for Violin and Viola), Op.78 (1993)
 Trio for violin, viola and cello, Op. 79 (1994)

Vocal
 Píseň máje (May Song) for male chorus (1942–1943); composed in Terezín
 Sloky lásky (Strophes of Love), Song Cycle on poetry by Stěpan Ščipačov for voice and piano, Op. 14 (1954)
 České písně (Czech Songs) for 3 female voices, or female or children's choir, and string quartet, Op. 17 (1955)
 Písně na slova Jana Pilaře (Songs on words by Jan Pilař) for voice and piano, Op. 21 (1955–1956)
 Písně na slova Aloise Volkmana (Songs on words by Alois Volkman) for voice and piano, Op. 68 (1989–1990)
 Balada o stromu (Ballad of a Tree) for voice and piano or organ, Op. 70 (1990)
 It Will Be Us Ever More, Cycle of male choruses on words by Jaroslav Marek, Op. 71 (1990)

Recordings
 Songs (on Krasa, Brundibar). Channel Classics.

References

External links
 František Domažlický at the Czech Music Information Centre

1913 births
1997 deaths
Czech composers
Czech male composers
Theresienstadt Ghetto survivors
Musicians from Prague
20th-century composers
20th-century Czech male musicians